Latouchea is a monotypic genus of flowering plants belonging to the family Gentianaceae. It only contains one species, Latouchea fokienensis Franch. 

It is native to southern China.

The genus name of Latouchea is in honour of John David Digues La Touche (1861–1935) an Irish ornithologist, naturalist, and zoologist as well as his wife, who both collected botanical specimens. The Latin specific epithet of fokienensis refers to his wife, née Caroline Dawson Focken (c. 1871 – c. 1945).  Both genus and species were first described and published in Bull. Soc. Bot. France Vol.46 on page 212 in 1899.

References

Gentianaceae
Gentianaceae genera
Plants described in 1899
Flora of China